Mutual Admiration Society is an album by Joe Locke and the  David Hazeltine Quartet that was released in 1999.

Track listing
 "K-Man's Crew" (Locke)
 "I Say a Little Prayer" (Bacharach/David)
 "Can We Talk?" (Hazeltine)
 "The Haze Factor" (Locke)
 "Tears in Her Heart" (Hazeltine)
 "Spring Will Be a Little Late This Year" (Loesser)
 "Diamonds Remain" (Locke)
 "For All We Know" (Lewis/Coots)

Personnel
 David Hazeltine – piano
 Joe Locke – vibraphone
 Essiet Essiet – bass
 Billy Drummond – drums

References

External links
 Joe Locke's official website

Jazz albums by American artists
1999 albums